

Events

January

February 

 February 20 – Boutros Ghali, the first native-born Prime Minister of Egypt, is assassinated in Cairo.

March 

 March – Albanian revolt of 1910: An uprising against Ottoman rule breaks out in Albania.
 March 8 – In France, Raymonde de Laroche is awarded Pilot's license No. 36 by the Federation Aeronautique Internationale, becoming the first woman authorized to fly an airplane.
 March 10
 Slavery in China, which has existed since the Shang dynasty, is now made illegal.
 Nazareth Baptist Church, an African-initiated church, is founded by Prophet Isaiah Shembe in South Africa.
 March 17 – Progressive Republicans in the United States House of Representatives rebel against Speaker Joseph Gurney Cannon, removing him from the Rules Committee, and stripping him of his power to appoint committee chairmen.
 March 18 – The first filmed version of Mary Shelley's Frankenstein comes out. Considered to be the first horror movie, it stars actor Charles Ogle as the monster.

April 

 April 5 – The Transandine Railway connecting Chile and Argentina is inaugurated.
 April 20 – Halley's Comet is visible from Earth (its next visit will be in 1986).

May 

 May 6 – George V becomes King of the United Kingdom of Great Britain and Ireland upon the death of his father, Edward VII.
 May 12 – The second National Association for the Advancement of Colored People meeting is held in New York City.
 May 18 – The Earth passes through the tail of Halley's Comet.
 May 31 – The Union of South Africa is created.

June 

 June 3 – The Norwegian Antarctic Expedition, led by Roald Amundsen on the steamer Fram, departs from Christiania (modern-day Oslo) without fanfare, and no announcement until later in the year of Amundsen's intention to reach the South Pole.
 June 5 – The Nanyang industrial exposition ("Nanking Exposition"), an official world's fair, opens in Qing dynasty China.
 June 6 – The Holland Dakota Landbouw Compagnie is established.
 June 15 – The British Antarctic Expedition, led by Robert Falcon Scott on the whaler Terra Nova, departs from Cardiff for the South Pole.
 June 22 – DELAG Zeppelin dirigible Deutschland makes the first commercial passenger flight, from Friedrichshafen to Düsseldorf in Germany; the flight takes 9 hours.
 June 25 – The ballet The Firebird (L'Oiseau de feu), the first major work by Russian composer Igor Stravinsky, commissioned by Diaghilev's Ballets Russes, is premièred in Paris, bringing the composer international fame.

July 

 July 4 – African-American boxer Jack Johnson defeats white American boxer James J. Jeffries in a heavyweight boxing match, sparking race riots across the United States.
 July 11 – Departure for France of Amenokal Moussa Ag Amastan as part of the Tuareg mission.
 July 22 – A wireless telegraph sent from the  results in the identification, arrest and execution of murderer Dr. Hawley Crippen.
 July 24 – Ottoman forces capture the city of Shkodër to put down the Albanian Revolt of 1910.

August 

 August – The International Commercial Bureau of the American Republics becomes the Pan-American Union.
 August 14 – A fire at the Brussels International 1910 world's fair destroys exhibitions of Britain and France.
 August 20 – The Great Fire of 1910 ("Big Blowup"), a wildfire that burns 4,700 square miles in the Inland Northwest of the United States, due to dry weather.
 August 22 – The Japan–Korea Treaty of 1910, by which the Empire of Japan formally annexes the Korean Empire, is signed (it becomes effectively void in 1945, which is formally recognised in 1965).
 August 28 – Montenegro is proclaimed an independent kingdom, under Nicholas I.
 August 29 – Emperor Sunjong of Korea abdicates and the country's monarchy is abolished.

September 

 September 1
 The Vatican introduces a compulsory oath against modernism (Sacrorum antistitum), to be taken by all priests upon ordination.
 Sport Club Corinthians Paulista is founded in Brazil by railwaymen; its Association football team will be the first FIFA Club World Cup champions in 2000.

October 

 October
 Infrared photographs are first published by Professor Robert Williams Wood, in the Royal Photographic Society's journal.
 Approximate date of origin of Manchurian plague, a form of pneumonic plague which by December is spreading through northeastern China, killing more than 40,000.
 October 5 – 5 October 1910 revolution: The First Portuguese Republic is proclaimed in Lisbon; King Manuel II of Portugal flees to England.
 October 7 – Baudette fire of 1910, a wildfire that burns ca. 350,000 square miles in Minnesota and Ontario, including several towns.
 October 18 – The lake freighter SS William C. Moreland runs aground on a reef near the Keweenaw Peninsula in Lake Superior, leading to its loss.
 October 20 – The hull of White Star ocean liner  is launched, at the Harland and Wolff Shipyards in Belfast.
 October 23
 Vajiravudh (Rama VI) is crowned King of Siam, after the death of his father, King Chulalongkorn (Rama V).
 The Philadelphia Athletics defeat the Chicago Cubs, 7–2, to win the 1910 World Series in baseball in Game 5 (Jack Coombs has been the winning pitcher in three of the Athletics' four wins).

November 

 November 7 – The first air flight for the purpose of delivering commercial freight takes place in the United States. The flight, made by Wright brothers pilot Philip Parmalee, is between Dayton and Columbus, Ohio.
 November 14 – In the first takeoff from a ship by a fixed-wing aircraft, Eugene Ely takes off from a temporary platform erected over the bow of the light cruiser USS Birmingham in Hampton Roads, Virginia.
 November 20 – The Mexican Revolution begins, when Francisco I. Madero proclaims the elections of 1910 null and void, and calls for an armed revolution at 6 p.m. against the illegitimate presidency/dictatorship of Porfirio Díaz.
 November 22 – Revolt of the Lash at Rio de Janeiro: Mutineers in the Brazilian Navy, led by João Cândido Felisberto, seize control of the new dreadnought battleship Minas Geraes, and other ships whose guns are aimed at the city, as the crews demand improvements in their conditions (which are conceded on November 26 by the Brazilian government).
 November 23 – Johan Alfred Ander becomes the last person to be executed in Sweden.

December 

 December 3 – Modern neon lighting is first demonstrated by Georges Claude at the Paris Motor Show.

Undated 
 The electric streetcars of Austria-Hungary, France, Germany and Great Britain are carrying 6.7 million riders per year.
 Henry Ford sells 10,000 automobiles.

Births

January 

 January 4
 Josephine McKim, American Olympic swimmer (d. 1992)
 Hilde Schrader, German swimmer (d. 1966)
 January 5 – Jack Lovelock, New Zealand Olympic athlete (d. 1949)
 January 8 – Galina Ulanova, Russian dancer (d. 1998)
 January 10
 Alioune Diop, Senegalese writer, editor (d. 1980)
 Allal al-Fassi, Moroccan politician, writer, poet and Islamic scholar (d. 1974)
 January 11 – Trygve Bratteli, Norwegian politician, Prime Minister of Norway (d. 1984)
 January 12 
 Luise Rainer, German-born actress (d. 2014)
 Patsy Kelly, American actress and comedienne (d. 1981)
 January 16 – Mario Tobino, Italian poet, writer and psychiatrist (d. 1991)
 January 21 – Károly Takács, Hungarian Olympic shooter (d. 1976)
 January 23 – Django Reinhardt, Belgian jazz musician (d. 1953)
 January 27 – Edvard Kardelj, Yugoslav political leader, partisan (d. 1979)
 January 28
 John Banner, Austrian film, television actor (d. 1973)
 Arnold Moss, American actor (d. 1989)

February 

 February 2 – David Sharpe, American actor, stunt performer (d. 1980)
 February 5 – Francisco Varallo, Argentine footballer (d. 2010)
 February 9 – Jacques Monod, French biologist, Nobel Prize laureate (d. 1976)
 February 10
 Princess Eugénie of Greece and Denmark (d. 1989)
 Georges Pire, Belgian monk and humanitarian, Nobel Prize laureate (d. 1969)
 Sofia Vembo, Greek singer and actress (d. 1978)
 February 13 – William Shockley, American physicist, Nobel Prize laureate (d. 1989)
 February 15 – Irena Sendler, Polish humanitarian (d. 2008)
 February 17
 Arthur Hunnicutt, American actor (d. 1979)
 Marc Lawrence, American actor (d. 2005)
 Kothamangalam Seenu, Tamil actor, Carnatic music singer (d. 2001)
 February 21 – Douglas Bader, British fighter pilot (d. 1982)
 February 22 – Vaughn Taylor, American actor (d. 1983)
 February 27
 Joan Bennett, American actress (d. 1990)
 Genrikh Kasparyan, Armenian chess player, composer (d. 1995)
 Carl Tchilinghiryan, German businessman (d. 1987)

March 

 March 1
 Archer Martin, British chemist, Nobel Prize laureate (d. 2002)
 David Niven, British actor (d. 1983)
 March 4 – Tancredo Neves, President of Brazil (d. 1985)
 March 5
 Momofuku Ando, Japanese inventor, businessman (d. 2007)
 Ennio Flaiano, Italian screenwriter, playwright, novelist, journalist and drama critic (d. 1972)
 March 7 – Will Glickman, American playwright (d. 1983)
 March 8 – Claire Trevor, American actress (d. 2000)
 March 9 – Samuel Barber, American composer (d. 1981)
 March 11
 Robert Havemann, German chemist (d. 1982)
 Jacinta Marto, Portuguese saint (d. 1920)
 March 12 – Masayoshi Ōhira, Prime Minister of Japan (d. 1980)
 March 13 – Karl Gustav Ahlefeldt, Danish actor (d. 1985)
 March 16 – Aladár Gerevich, Hungarian fencer (d. 1991)
 March 21 – Muhammad Siddiq Khan, Bangladeshi academic and librarian (d. 1978)
 March 23 – Akira Kurosawa, Japanese screenwriter, producer and director (d. 1998)
 March 24
 Sailor Malan, South African Battle of Britain fighter pilot (d. 1963)
 Richard Halsey Best, US Navy pilot (d. 2001)
 March 25 – Magda Olivero, Italian soprano (d. 2014)
 March 27 – Hugh Nibley, American scholar and Latter-day Saint apologist (d. 2005)
 March 28 – Ingrid of Sweden, Queen consort of Denmark (d. 2000)
 March 31 – Edward Seago, British artist (d. 1974)

April 

 April 1 – Harry Carney, American jazz musician (d. 1974)
 April 2 – Chico Xavier, Brazilian medium (d. 2002)
 April 4 – Barthélemy Boganda, Central African politician (d. 1959)
 April 6 – Barys Kit, Belarusian scientist (d. 2018)
 April 9 – Nouhak Phoumsavanh, 3rd President of Laos (d. 2008)
 April 10 – Paul Sweezy, American economist, editor (d. 2004)
 April 11 – António de Spínola, 14th President of Portugal (d. 1996)
 April 12
 Gillo Dorfles, Italian art critic, painter and philosopher (d. 2018)
 Irma Rapuzzi, French politician (d. 2018)
 April 14 - Stanisław Kowalski, Polish supercentenarian, athlete (d. 2022)
 April 20 – Brigitte Mira, German actress (d. 2005)
 April 22 – Friedrich Franz, Hereditary Grand Duke of Mecklenburg-Schwerin (d. 2001)
 April 23 – Simone Simon, French actress (d. 2005)
 April 24 – Pupella Maggio, Italian actress (d. 1999)
 April 26 – Tomoyuki Tanaka, Japanese film producer (d. 1997)
 April 27
 Chiang Ching-kuo, President of the Republic of China (d. 1988)
 Pascoal Ranieri Mazzilli, 2-time President of Brazil (d. 1975)
 April 30 – Levi Celerio, Filipino composer, lyricist (d. 2002)

May 

 May 1
 Raya Dunayevskaya, Russian-born philosopher, founder of Marxist humanism in the United States (d. 1987)
 J. Allen Hynek, American astronomer, ufologist (d. 1986)
 Mary Rockefeller, American heiress, socialite and philanthropist (d. 1997)
 May 6 – June Gittelson, American film actress (d. 1993)
 May 12
 Johan Ferrier, 1st President of Suriname (d. 2010)
 Elwyn Flint, Australian linguist and academic (d. 1983)
 Dorothy Hodgkin, British chemist, Nobel Prize laureate (d. 1994)
 Giulietta Simionato, Italian mezzo-soprano (d. 2010)
 May 14 – Ne Win, 4th President of Burma (d. 2002)
 May 23
 Scatman Crothers, African-American actor, musician (d. 1986)
 Artie Shaw, American clarinetist, bandleader (d. 2004)
 May 25 – Edward Harrison, English cricketer, squash player (d. 2002)
 May 28
 Rachel Kempson, English actress (d. 2003)
 T-Bone Walker, American singer (d. 1975)
 May 29 – Ralph Metcalfe, American athlete (d. 1978)
 May 30 – Inge Meysel, German actress (d. 2004)

June 

 June 1 – Gyula Kállai, 48th Prime Minister of Hungary (d. 1996)
 June 2 – Annie Lee Cooper, American civil rights activist (d. 2010)
 June 4 – Christopher Cockerell, British engineer, inventor of the Hovercraft (d. 1999)
 June 8 – Lauro Ortega Martínez, governor of Morelos, Mexico 1982–1988 (d. 1999)
 June 9 – Robert Cummings, American actor (d. 1990)
 June 10
 Abdul Rahman al-Eryani, President of the Yemen Arab Republic (d. 1998)
 Armen Takhtajan, Soviet-Armenian botanist (d. 2009)
 Howlin' Wolf, African-American blues musician (d. 1976)
 Ted Richmond, American film producer (d. 2013)
 June 11 – Jacques-Yves Cousteau, French naval officer, explorer (d. 1997)
 June 12 – Ahmadu Bello, Nigerian statesman (d. 1966)
 June 13 – Mary Wickes, American actress (d. 1995)
 June 14
 Rudolf Kempe, German conductor (d. 1976)
 J. Harold Smith, American pastor, evangelist (d. 2001)
 June 15 – Suleiman Frangieh, 10th President of Lebanon (d. 1992)
 Alf Pearson, British variety performer with his brother Bob as half of Bob and Alf Pearson (d. 2012)
 June 16 – Juan Velasco Alvarado, military President of Peru (d. 1977)
 June 17 – Red Foley, American country music singer (d. 1968)
 June 19
 Paul Flory, American chemist, Nobel Prize laureate (d. 1985)
 Abe Fortas, Associate Justice of the Supreme Court of the United States (d. 1982)
 June 22
 Peter Pears, English tenor (d. 1986)
 Anne Ziegler, born Irené Eastwood, English soprano (d. 2003)
 Konrad Zuse, German engineer (d. 1995)
 June 23
 Jean Anouilh, French dramatist (d. 1987)
 Lydia Delectorskaya, Russian refugee, model (d. 1998)
 Gordon B. Hinckley, 15th president of the Church of Jesus Christ of Latter-day Saints (d. 2008)
 June 25 – Ian McTaggart-Cowan, Scottish-Canadian zoologist (d. 2010)
 June 26
 Margaret Dunning, American philanthropist (d. 2015)
 Roy J. Plunkett, American chemist noted for discovering Teflon (d. 1994)
 June 27 – Pierre Joubert, French illustrator (d. 2001)
 June 28 – Ingrid Luterkort, Swedish actress, stage director (d. 2011)

July 

 July 2 – Louise Laroche, one of the last remaining survivors of the sinking of the RMS Titanic on April 15, 1912 (d. 1998)
 July 4 – Gloria Stuart, American actress (d. 2010)
 July 5 – S. Poniman, Indonesian singer and actor (d. 1978)
 July 6
 John Knott, Australian public servant (d. 1999)
 Jayna Rowley, American model (d.2000)
 René Le Grevès, French cyclist (d. 1946)
 July 8 – Carlos Betances Ramírez, first Puerto Rican to command a battalion in the Korean War (d. 2001)
 July 9 – Govan Mbeki, South African anti-apartheid activist, politician (d. 2001)
 July 10
 Nguyễn Hữu Thọ, Vietnamese politician (d. 1996)
 Ne Win, Burmese politician, military commander (d. 2002)
 July 11
 Sally Blane, American actress (d. 1997)
 John Stapp, American career U.S. Air Force officer, flight surgeon, physician and biophysicist (d. 1999)
 July 12
 Samuel Hazard Gillespie Jr., American counsel (d. 2011)
 Laszlo Szapáry, Austrian sports shooter (d. 1998)
 July 14 – William Hanna, American animator (d. 2001)
 July 15
 Bettie du Toit, South African trade unionist and anti-apartheid activist (d. 2002)
 Ken Lynch, American actor (d. 1990)
 July 17 – James Coyne, 2nd Governor of the Bank of Canada (1955–1961) (d. 2012)
 July 18 – Mamadou Dia, 1st Prime Minister of Senegal (d. 2009)
 July 19 – Mamadou M'Bodje, Malian politician (d. 1958)
 July 20 – Muriel Evans, American actress (d. 2000)
 July 21 – Pietro Pasinati, Italian football player (d. 2000)
 July 22
 Gordon Blake, U.S. Air Force lieutenant general (d. 1997)
 Ruthie Tompson, American animator, artist (d. 2021)
 July 27
 Julien Gracq, French author (d. 2007)
 Lupita Tovar, Mexican-born American actress (d. 2016)

August 

 August 4
 Anita Page, American actress (d. 2008)
 William Schuman, American composer (d. 1992)
 August 6 – Adoniran Barbosa, Brazilian musician, singer, composer, humorist and actor (d. 1982)
 August 7 – Lucien Hervé, Hungarian-born French photographer (d. 2007)
 August 10 – Aldo Buzzi, Italian architect, director and screenwriter (d. 2009)
 August 12
 Yusof bin Ishak, 1st President of Singapore (d. 1970)
 Jane Wyatt, American actress (d. 2006)
 August 14
 Nüzhet Gökdoğan, Turkish astronomer and mathematician (d. 2003)
 Pierre Schaeffer, French composer (d. 1995)
 August 15 – Josef Klaus, 16th Chancellor of Austria (d. 2001)
 August 19 – Saint Alphonsa, Indian saint (d. 1946)
 August 22 – Lucille Ricksen, American silent film actress (d. 1925)
 August 25
 George Cisar, American baseball player (d. 2010)
 Dorothea Tanning, American artist (d. 2012)
 August 26
 Katherine Fryer, English artist (d. 2017)
 Mother Teresa, Macedonian-born Albanian-Indian nun, Nobel Prize laureate (d. 1997)
 August 28 – Tjalling Koopmans, Dutch economist, Nobel Prize laureate (d. 1985)
 August 29 – Georges Loinger, French resistance fighter (d. 2018)

September 

 September 1 – Edda Mussolini, eldest child of Benito Mussolini (d. 1995)
 September 3 – Maurice Papon, French civil servant and collaborator (d. 2007)
 September 5 – Ralph Berkowitz, American composer, classical musician, and painter (d. 2011)
 September 10 – Charles August Nichols, American animator, film director (d. 1992)
 September 11 – Gerhard Schröder, German politician (d. 1989)
 September 14 – Jack Hawkins, British actor (d. 1973)
 September 15 – Robert Carter, British Royal Air Force officer (d. 2012)
 September 16
 Erich Kempka, German chauffeur, bodyguard of Adolf Hitler (d. 1975)
 Karl Kling, German race car driver (d. 2003)
 September 19 – Margaret Lindsay, American film actress (d. 1981)
 September 21 – Zhang Tianfu, Chinese agronomist, tea expert (d. 2017)
 September 22
 Louis Bisdee, Australian politician (d. 2010)
 Hidekichi Miyazaki, Japanese athlete (d. 2019)
 September 24 – Ignatius J. "Pete" Galantin, United States Navy admiral (d. 2004)
 September 28
 Diosdado Macapagal, 9th President of the Philippines (d. 1997)
 Wenceslao Vinzons, Filipino politician, resistance leader (d. 1942)
 September 29 – Virginia Bruce, American actress, singer (d. 1982)
 September 30 – Jussi Kekkonen, Finnish major (d. 1962)

October 

 October 1
 Bonnie Parker, American outlaw, member of Barrow Gang (d. 1934)
 Attilio Pavesi, Italian Olympic cyclist (d. 2011)
 October 8
 Paulette Dubost, French actress (d. 2011)
 Gus Hall, American Communist leader (d. 2000)
 October 10
 Sir Albert Margai, 2nd Prime Minister of Sierra Leone (d. 1980)
 Julius Shulman, American architectural photographer (d. 2009)
 October 13 – Robert McKimson, American animator, director (d. 1977)
 October 19
 Farid al-Atrash, Arab composer, singer and actor (d. 1974)
 Subrahmanyan Chandrasekhar, Indian-born American physicist, Nobel Prize laureate (d. 1995)
 October 23
 Richard Mortensen, Danish painter (d. 1993)
 Hayden Rorke, American actor (d. 1987)
 October 24 – Gunter d'Alquen, German journalist, propagandist and SS unit commander (d. 1998)
 October 25
 Tyrus Wong, Chinese-born American artist (d. 2016)
 David Lichine, Russian-American ballet dancer, choreographer (d. 1972)
 October 27
 Jack Carson, Canadian-born actor (d. 1963)
 Herschel Daugherty, American television director (d. 1993)
 October 31 – Trevor Housley, Australian public servant (d. 1968)

November–December 

 November 4 – Agda Rössel, UN Ambassador (d. 2001)
 November 6 – Erik Ode, German television actor (d. 1983)
 November 20 – Pauli Murray, African-American civil rights activist, lawyer, author and Episcopal priest (d. 1985)
 November 21 – Abd al-Aziz ibn Baz, Grand Mufti of Saudi Arabia (d. 1999)
 November 26 – Cyril Cusack, South African–born actor (d. 1993)
 November 30 – Harry Bauler, American politician (d. 1962)
 December 1
 Dame Alicia Markova, born Lilian Marks, English ballerina (d. 2004)
 Louis Slotin, Canadian physicist, chemist (d. 1946)
 December 4 – R. Venkataraman, 8th President of India (d. 2009)
 December 7
 Louis Prima, American singer-songwriter and bandleader (d. 1978)
 Edmundo Ros, Trinidadian musician (d. 2011)
 December 11 – Noel Rosa, Brazilian songwriter (d. 1937)
 December 15 – John Hammond, American record producer (d. 1987)
 December 19 – Jean Genet, French writer (d. 1986)
 December 23
 Princess María de las Mercedes of Bourbon-Two Sicilies (d. 2000)
 Kurt "Panzermeyer" Meyer, German Generalmajor der Waffen-SS, war criminal (d. 1961)
 December 29
 Michel Aflaq, Syrian political theorist, founder of Ba'athism (d. 1989)
 Ronald Coase, English-born economist, Nobel Prize laureate (d. 2013)
 December 30 – Paul Bowles, American author (d. 1999)
 December 31 – Mallikarjun Mansur, Hindustani classical vocalist (d. 1992)

Date unknown 
 Fawzi Al-Mulki, Prime Minister of Jordan (d. 1962)

Deaths

January 
 January 1 – Harriet Powers, American folk artist (b. 1837)
 January 4 – Léon Delagrange, French pioneer aviator (b. 1873)
 January 5 – Léon Walras, French economist (b. 1834)
 January 12 – Bass Reeves, one of the first African-American Deputy U.S. Marshals west of the Mississippi River (b. 1838)
 January 13 – Andrew Jackson Davis, American spiritualist (b. 1826)
 January 25 – W. G. Read Mullan, American Jesuit, academic (b. 1860)
 January 27 – Thomas Crapper, British plumber (b. 1836)
 January 29 – Sir Charles Todd, Australian telegraph pioneer (b. 1826)
 January 30 – Granville Woods, African-American inventor (b. 1856)

February 

 February 6 – Alfonso Maria Fusco, Italian Roman Catholic priest, saint (b. 1839)
 February 7 – Elizabeth Martha Olmsted, American poet (b. 1825)
 February 9 – Miguel Febres Cordero, Ecuadorian Roman Catholic religious brother (b. 1854)
 February 10 – Lucy Stanton, American abolitionist (b. 1831)
 February 14 – Giovanni Passannante, Italian anarchist (b. 1849)
 February 20 – Boutros Ghali, Prime Minister of Egypt (assassinated) (b. 1846)
 February 23 – Vera Komissarzhevskaya, Russian actress (b. 1864)
 February 26 – Esther E. Baldwin, American missionary (b. 1840)

March 

 March 1 – José Domingo de Obaldía, 2nd President of Panama (b. 1845)
 March 4 – Knut Ångström, Swedish physicist (b. 1857)
 March 9 – Fredrik von Otter, 8th Prime Minister of Sweden (b. 1833)
 March 10 – Karl Lueger, Austrian mayor (b. 1844)
 March 18 – Julio Herrera y Reissig, Uruguayan poet, writer (b. 1875)
 March 20 – Nadar, French photographer (b. 1820)
 March 26 – An Jung-geun, Korean assassin (b. 1879)
 March 27 – Alexander Agassiz, American scientist (b. 1835)
 March 28 – David Josiah Brewer, American Associate Justice of the Supreme Court (b. 1837)
 March 29 – H. Maria George Colby, American fashion editor (b. 1844)
 March 30 – Jean Moréas, Greek poet, essayist and art critic (b. 1856)

April 

 April 4 – Augusta Harvey Worthen, American educator and author (b. 1823)
 April 15 – Angelia Thurston Newman, American activist and author (b. 1837)
 April 12 – William Graham Sumner, American social scientist (b. 1840)
 April 21
 Anne Isabella Robertson, Anglo-Irish writer and suffragist (b. circa 1830)
 Mark Twain, American writer (b. 1835)
 April 26 – Bjørnstjerne Bjørnson, Norwegian writer, Nobel Prize laureate (b. 1832)

May 

 May 1 – Pierre Nord Alexis, President of Haiti (b. 1820)
 May 3 – Howard Taylor Ricketts, American pathologist (b. 1871)
 May 6 – King Edward VII of the United Kingdom (b. 1841)
 May 10 – Stanislao Cannizzaro, Italian chemist (b. 1826)
 May 12 – Sir William Huggins, British astronomer (b. 1824)
 May 18 – Pauline Viardot, French mezzo-soprano, composer (b. 1821)
 May 22 – Jules Renard, French writer (b. 1864)
 May 27 – Robert Koch, German physician, Nobel Prize laureate (b. 1843)
 May 28 – Kálmán Mikszáth, Hungarian novelist (b. 1847)
 May 29 – Mily Balakirev, Russian composer (b. 1837)
 May 31 – Elizabeth Blackwell, British-born American physician (b. 1821)

June 
 June 5 – William Sydney Porter (alias O. Henry), American novelist (b. 1862)
 June 7 – Goldwin Smith, British-born Canadian historian and journalist (b. 1823)
 June 8 – Henry Granger Piffard, New York dermatologist and author of the first systematic treatise on dermatology in America (b. 1842)
 June 11 – Maria Schininà, Italian Roman Catholic religious professed (b. 1844)
 June 24 – Juan Williams Rebolledo, Chilean admiral and politician (b. 1825)

July 

 July 3 – Tokugawa Akitake, Japanese daimyō, the last lord of Mito Domain, younger brother of the last shōgun Tokugawa Yoshinobu (b. 1853)
 July 4
 Melville Fuller, American Chief Justice (b. 1833)
 Giovanni Schiaparelli, Italian astronomer (b. 1835)
 July 10 – Johann Gottfried Galle, German astronomer (b. 1812)
 July 12 – Charles Rolls, British aviator, automobile manufacturer (b. 1877)

August 

 August 6 – Klemens Bachleda, Polish Tatra guide and mountain rescuer (b. 1851)
 August 10 – S. Isadore Miner, American journalist (b. 1863)
 August 13 – Florence Nightingale, British nurse (b. 1820)
 August 14 – Frank Podmore, British psychical researcher (b. 1856)
 August 15 – Constantin Fahlberg, Russian chemist (b. 1850)
 August 16 – Pedro Montt, 15th President of Chile (b. 1849)
 August 26 
William James, American psychologist, philosopher (b. 1842)
Thomas Petrie, Australian explorer, gold prospector, logger and grazier (b. 1831)
 August 28 – Paolo Mantegazza, Italian neurologist, physiologist, anthropologist, and fiction author (b. 1831)

September 
 September 1 – Alexander Mikhaylovich Zaytsev, Russian chemist (b. 1841)
 September 2 – Henri Rousseau, French painter (b. 1844)
 September 6 – Elías Fernández Albano, president of Chile (b. 1845)
 September 7
 Emily Blackwell, American physician (b. 1826)
 William Holman Hunt, British Pre-Raphaelite painter (b. 1827)
 September 14 – Lombe Atthill, Northern Irish obstetrician and gynaecologist (b. 1827)
 September 16 – Hormuzd Rassam, Iraqi archaeologist (b. 1826)
 September 23 – Tup Scott, Australian cricketer (b. 1858)
 September 27 – Jorge Chávez, Peruvian aviator (b. 1887)
 September 28 – Marie Pasteur, French chemist (b. 1826)
 September 29 – Winslow Homer, American painter (b. 1836)

October 

 October 3 – Lucy Hobbs Taylor, American dentist (b. 1833)
 October 17
 Carlo Michelstaedter, Italian philosopher (b. 1887)
 Julia Ward Howe, American abolitionist, poet (b. 1819)
 October 21 – Charles van der Stappen, Belgian sculptor (b. 1843)
 October 23 – King Chulalongkorn (Rama V) of Siam (b. 1853)
 October 27 – Henrietta Gould Rowe, American litterateur (b. 1835)
 October 30 – Jean Henri Dunant, Swiss founder of the Red Cross, Nobel Prize laureate (b. 1828)

November 

 November 6 – Giuseppe Cesare Abba, Italian patriot, writer (b. 1838)
 November 7 – Florencio Sánchez, Uruguayan playwright (b. 1875)
 November 13 – Isabel Grimes Richey, American poet (b. 1858)
 November 15 – Wilhelm Raabe, German writer (b. 1831)
 November 19 – Wilhelm Rudolph Fittig, German chemist (b. 1835)
 November 20 (N.S.) – Leo Tolstoy, Russian writer (b. 1828)
 November 23
 Hawley Harvey Crippen, American murderer (executed) (b. 1862)
 Octave Chanute, French-American engineer, aviation pioneer (b. 1832)

December 

 December 1 – William Pryor Letchworth, American businessman and philanthropist (b. 1823)
 December 3
 Mary Baker Eddy, American religious leader, founder of Christian Science (b. 1821)
 Wesley Merritt, American general (b. 1836)
 December 8 – Paškal Buconjić, Herzegovinian Catholic bishop (b. 1834)
 December 28 – Benjamin Pitman, English-born American stenographer and crafts promoter (b. 1822)
 December 29 – Reginald Doherty, British tennis player (b. 1872)
 December 31 – John Moisant, American aviator (b. 1868)

Date unknown 
 Emma Bedelia Dunham, American poet and teacher (b. 1826)

Nobel Prizes 

 Chemistry – Otto Wallach
 Literature – Paul Heyse
 Medicine – Albrecht Kossel
 Peace – Permanent International Peace Bureau
 Physics – Johannes Diderik van der Waals

References

Primary sources and year books 
 New International Year Book 1910 970pp of detailed global coverage.
 Gilbert, Martin. A History of the Twentieth Century: Volume 1 1900–1933 (1997); global coverage of politics, diplomacy and warfare; pp 206–24.